General Electric Theater was an American anthology series hosted by Ronald Reagan that was broadcast on CBS radio and television. The series was sponsored by General Electric's Department of Public Relations.

Radio
After an audition show on January 18, 1953, titled The Token, with Dana Andrews, the radio series, a summer replacement for The Bing Crosby Program, debuted on CBS on July 9, 1953, with Ronald Colman in an episode based on  Random Harvest. With such guest stars as Cary Grant, Irene Dunne, Van Johnson, Jane Wyman, William Holden, Alan Young, Dorothy McGuire, John Hodiak, Ann Blyth, James Mason, Joan Fontaine, and Judy Garland the series continued until October 1, 1953. Jaime del Valle produced and directed the show. Ken Carpenter was the host and announcer. Wilbur Hatch supplied the music.

Also known as G.E. Stereo Theater, the program "was the first network radio series to be broadcast on FM in stereo."

Television
The television version of the program, produced by MCA-TV/Revue, was broadcast every Sunday evening at 9:00 pm EST, beginning February 1 1953, and ending June 3 1962. Each of the estimated 209 television episodes was an adaptation of a novel, short story, play, film, or magazine fiction. An exception was the 1954 episode "Music for Christmas", which featured choral director Fred Waring and his group The Pennsylvanians performing Christmas music. Jacques Tourneur directed four episodes, "The Martyr'" (1955), "Into the Night" (1955), "Aftermath" (1960) and "Star Witness: The Lili Parrish Story" (1961). The April 24, 1960, episode, "Adam's Apples", was the pilot for the situation comedy Ichabod and Me, which aired on CBS during the 1961–1962 television season.

On September 26, 1954, Ronald Reagan debuted as the only host of the program. GE added a host to provide continuity in the anthology format. The show's Nielsen ratings improved from #27 in the 1953–1954 season to #17 in 1954–1955, followed #11 in 1955–1956, #3 in 1956–1957, #7 in 1957–1958, #26 in 1958–1959, #23 in 1959–1960, and #20 in 1960–1961. General Electric Theater made the already well-known Reagan wealthy, due to his partial ownership of the show.

Reagan's contract with GE also entailed work as a motivational speaker for the company. After eight years as host, Reagan estimated he had visited 135 GE research and manufacturing facilities, and met over 250,000 people. During that time, he would also speak at other forums such as Rotary clubs and Moose lodges, presenting views on economic progress that in form and content were often similar to what he said in introductions, segues, and closing comments on the show as a spokesman for GE. Reagan, who would later be known as "The Great Communicator" because of his oratorical ability, often credited these engagements as helping him develop his public-speaking abilities.

Television guest stars
Among the guest stars on the anthology were:

 Bud Abbott
 Edie Adams
 Nick Adams
 Claude Akins
 Eddie Albert
 Leon Ames
 Edward Andrews
 Fred Astaire
 Phyllis Avery
 Parley Baer
 Raymond Bailey
 Patricia Barry
 Anne Baxter
 Fred Beir
 Bea Benaderet
 Jack Benny
 Whit Bissell
 Joan Blondell
 Ray Bolger
 Ward Bond
 Scott Brady
 Neville Brand
 Ernest Borgnine
 Stephen Boyd
 Diane Brewster
 Charles Bronson
 Sally Brophy
 Edgar Buchanan
 Terry Burnham (3 appearances)
 Michael Burns
 Francis X. Bushman
 Red Buttons
 Macdonald Carey
 Jack Carson
 Jack Cassidy
 Gower Champion
 Marge Champion
 George Chandler
 Lon Chaney, Jr.
 Phyllis Coates
 Lee J. Cobb
 Claudette Colbert
 Ronald Colman
 Chuck Connors
 Richard Conte
 Russ Conway
 Ellen Corby
 Lou Costello
 Joseph Cotten
 Jerome Cowan
 Bob Crane
 Joan Crawford
 Hume Cronyn
 Tony Curtis
 Bette Davis
 Sammy Davis, Jr.
 Jim Davis (actor)
 James Dean
 Richard Denning
 Elinor Donahue
 Ann Doran
 Dan Duryea
 John Ericson
 Bill Erwin
 Richard Eyer
 William Fawcett
 Frank Ferguson
 Nina Foch
 Joan Fontaine
 Eduard Franz
 Eva Gabor
 Zsa Zsa Gabor
 Judy Garland
 Greer Garson
 Anthony George
 George Gobel
 Billy Gray
 Virginia Gregg
 Virginia Grey
 Kevin Hagen
 Alan Hale, Jr.
 Brooke Hayward
 Barbara Hale
 Darryl Hickman
 Ed Hinton
 Dennis Holmes
 Skip Homeier
 Ron Howard
 Gary Hunley
 Kim Hunter
 Burl Ives
 Victor Jory
 Allyn Joslyn
 Louis Jourdan
 Boris Karloff
 Joseph Kearns
 Ricky Kelman
 Stan Kenton
 Ernie Kovacs
 Otto Kruger
 Nancy Kulp
 Alan Ladd
 Michael Landon
 Joi Lansing
 Keith Larsen
 Charles Laughton
 Piper Laurie
 Cloris Leachman
 Art Linkletter
 Myrna Loy
 Dayton Lummis
 Carol Lynley
 Dorothy Malone
 Flip Mark
 Strother Martin
 Scott Marlowe
 Nora Marlowe
 E. G. Marshall
 Lee Marvin (record 7 appearances)
 Chico Marx
 Groucho Marx
 Harpo Marx
 Raymond Massey
 Walter Matthau
 Tyler MacDuff
 Gisele MacKenzie
 Fred MacMurray
 George Macready
 Kevin McCarthy
 John McIntire
 Eve McVeagh
 Patrick McVey
 Tyler McVey
 Joyce Meadows
 Burgess Meredith
 Gary Merrill
 Robert Middleton
 Vera Miles
 Ray Milland
 Ewing Mitchell
 George Montgomery
 Rita Moreno
 Dennis Morgan
 Read Morgan
 Audie Murphy
 Burt Mustin
 Leslie Nielsen
 Lloyd Nolan
 Dan O'Herlihy
 J. Pat O'Malley
 Geraldine Page 
 Barbara Parkins
 Neva Patterson
 John Payne
 Larry Pennell
 Suzanne Pleshette
 Judson Pratt
 Vincent Price
 Nancy Davis Reagan
 Jason Robards, Sr.
 Ruth Roman
 George Sanders
 Karen Sharpe
 Robert F. Simon
 Dean Stockwell
 Everett Sloane
 Stella Stevens
 Jimmy Stewart
 Nick Stewart
 Olive Sturgess
 Hope Summers
 Gloria Talbott
 Rod Taylor
 Phyllis Thaxter
 Gene Tierney
 Audrey Totter
 Harry Townes
 Claire Trevor
 Lurene Tuttle
 Gary Vinson
 Beverly Washburn
 David Wayne
 Christine White
 Jesse White
 Cornel Wilde
 Rhys Williams
 Natalie Wood
 Fay Wray
 Will Wright
 Ed Wynn
 Keenan Wynn

Reagan fired by General Electric

Michael Reagan, adopted son of Ronald Reagan and Jane Wyman, contends that Attorney General of the United States Robert F. Kennedy pressured GE to cancel The General Electric Theater or at least to fire Reagan as the host if the program were to continue. The series was not dropped because of low ratings but political intervention, the younger Reagan still maintains. Michael claimed that Robert Kennedy told GE officials that the company would receive no federal contracts so long as Reagan was host of the series. Michael noted the irony that his father's dismissal propelled Reagan into the political arena, and eighteen years afterwards, Reagan would take the oath of office as the oldest person to become U.S. president up to that time (Joe Biden would surpass this record with his election in 2020) Kennedy's directive is another example of the "law of unintended consequences". Had Kennedy stayed out of GE contract matters, likely there would have been no Governor or President Reagan.

From Reagan: The Life, H.W. Brands, Anchor Books, New York 2015

Page 124–125: Reagan's jeremiads against encroaching government cited the Tennessee Valley Authority (TVA) as a case in point – until he got wind that TVA executives were listening and wondering to General Electric's boss, Ralph Cordiner, why they shouldn't shift their purchases to a more appreciative company. Cordiner said he wouldn't censor Reagan – a move that caused Reagan to censor himself. Reagan recalled saying: “Mr Cordiner, what would you say if I could make my speech just as effectively without mentioning TVA?” [He also recalled the response:] “Well, it would make my job easier.” Reagan concluded the story “Dropping TVA from my speech was no problem.” [This quote is taken directly from Where's the Rest of Me?, Ronald Reagan with Richard G. Hublen, Duell, Sloan and Pearce, New York, 1965, pp. 269–270]

Page 131: In 1961, the Justice Department launched a probe into price-fixing in the electrical equipment industry. General Electric was a prime target. Corporate management decided prudence lay in avoiding anything that raised the company's profile needlessly. Reagan's attacks on big government did just that. .... The company offered to keep him on pitching commercial products if he would stop talking politics. ...He decided the reduced stage was too small.

From An American Life, Simon and Schuster, New York, 1990, page 137: “In 1962, there was a change in management at General Electric that brought an end to my satisfying eight-year relationship with the company. Ralph Cordiner was retiring and the new management asked me, in addition to continuing as host of the GE Theater, to go on the road and become a pitchman for General Electric products – in other words, become a salesman. I told them that after developing such a following by speaking out about the issues I believed in, I wasn't going to go out and peddle toasters.

From When Character was King, Peggy Noonan, Penguin, New York, 2001, page 84:, New management asked him to stay on....but go on the road and pitch GE products. They insisted. He said no. They cancelled.

Don Herbert, a television personality well known as the host of Watch Mr. Wizard, appeared as the "General Electric Progress Reporter", adding a scientific touch to the institutional advertising pitch. The show was produced by Revue Studios, whose successor-in-interest, NBC Universal Television, was co-owned by GE.

Following General Electric Theaters cancellation in 1962, the series was replaced in the same time slot by the short-lived GE-sponsored GE True, hosted by Jack Webb.

On March 17, 2010, General Electric presented Reagan's widow Nancy Davis Reagan with video copies of 208 episodes of General Electric Theater, to be donated to the Ronald Reagan Presidential Library.

On April 20, 2010, a "lost" live episode of General Electric Theater – "The Dark, Dark Hours", which originally aired on December 12, 1954 – was uncovered by NBC writer Wayne Federman, who was working on a television retrospective for the Reagan Centennial Celebration. The episode was noteworthy because it teamed Ronald Reagan with James Dean. Highlights were broadcast on the CBS Evening News, NBC Nightly News, and Good Morning America.

Directors

 "The Martyr", directed by Jacques Tourneur (1956) (25 min)
 "Into the Night", directed by Jacques Tourneur (1955) (25 min)
 "Aftermath", directed by Jacques Tourneur (1960) (25 min)
 "Star Witness: The Lili Parrish Story", directed by Jacques Tourneur (1961) (25 min)

References

Further reading
William L. Bird, Jr. "Better Living": Advertising, Media, and the New Vocabulary of Business Leadership, 1935–1955. Evanston, IL: Northwestern University Press, 1999.

External links

Article on GE Theater from the Museum of Broadcast Communications
Jerry Haendiges Vintage Radio Logs: General Electric Theater
General Electric Theater, Museum of Broadcast Communications
Company Voice Advertising, Museum of Broadcast Communications 
General Electric Theater at CVTA

1953 American television series debuts
1962 American television series endings
1950s American radio programs
1950s American anthology television series
1960s American anthology television series
Anthology radio series
Black-and-white American television shows
CBS original programming
CBS Radio programs
English-language television shows
General Electric sponsorships
American live television series
Television series by Universal Television
Ronald Reagan